Årsta Church is a church in Årsta, Uppsala, Sweden that was built in 1974, and was designed by Samuel Fränne. The church was originally owned by the Uppsala Missionary Congregation, but is now a district church in Vaksala parish. It has an ecumenical cooperation with the Swedish Salvation Army.

The church also runs a pre-school for children who are 0–5 years old.

Gallery

References 

Churches in Uppsala County
Churches in the Diocese of Uppsala